The Fixer is a novel by Bernard Malamud published in 1966 by Farrar, Straus & Giroux. It won the U.S. National Book Award for Fiction (his second)
and the Pulitzer Prize for Fiction.

The Fixer provides a fictionalized version of the Beilis case. Menahem Mendel Beilis was a Jew unjustly imprisoned in Tsarist Russia. The "Beilis trial" of 1913 caused an international uproar and Beilis was acquitted by a jury.

The book was adapted into a 1968 film of the same name starring Alan Bates (Yakov Bok) who received an Oscar nomination.

Plagiarism controversy

Descendants of Mendel Beilis have long argued that in writing The Fixer, Malamud plagiarized from the 1926 English edition of Beilis's memoir, The Story of My Sufferings. One of Beilis's sons made such claims in correspondence to Malamud when The Fixer was first published. A 2011 edition of Beilis's memoir, co-edited by one of his grandsons, claims to identify 35 instances of plagiarism by Malamud.

Responding to the allegations of plagiarism made by Beilis's descendants, Malamud's biographer Philip Davis acknowledged "some close verbal parallels" between Beilis's memoir and Malamud's novel. Davis argued, however, "When it mattered most, [Malamud's] sentences offered a different dimension and a deeper emotion."

Jewish Studies scholar Michael Tritt has characterized the relationship between Malamud's The Fixer and Beilis's The Story of My Sufferings as one of "indebtedness and innovation".

Censorship
The book was banned by the board of education of the Island Trees Union Free School District in New York, which was the subject of a U.S. Supreme Court case in 1982.

In popular culture
In episode 7 of Mad Men Season 5, the character Don Draper is seen reading the novel in bed and recommending it to his wife Megan.

References

1966 American novels
Novels about antisemitism
Pulitzer Prize for Fiction-winning works
Jews and Judaism in the Russian Empire
American novels adapted into films
Novels by Bernard Malamud
Novels set in Ukraine
Novels set in Kyiv
Novels set in Russia
National Book Award for Fiction winning works
Farrar, Straus and Giroux books
Novels involved in plagiarism controversies
Censored books